The Last Drop is a 2006 British-Romanian adventure war film by Colin Teague that was released direct to video. Teague teamed up with Gary Young, with whom he had previously collaborated on the British crime drama films Shooters and Spivs. Andrew Howard and Louis Dempsey, who cowrote Shooters alongside Teague and Young, both appear briefly in the film.

Plot 

The film is set against the backdrop of World War II, during Operation Market Garden, the largest full scale airborne invasion in history. Corporal Powell (Neil Newbon), an undercover British Intelligence officer, has been given command of a small unit of men, codenamed Matchbox. Their assignment is to retrieve a hoard of Dutch gold and art treasures plundered by the Nazis, from a seemingly impregnable booby-trapped underground bunker. Simple enough, but when Matchbox is shot down short of the drop point their plan goes awry and Powell is forced to recruit the assistance of several colorful characters, including a smart-mouthed petty thief (Nick Moran), a drunken bomb disposal expert (Tommy Flanagan), and a smooth talking Canadian pilot with a keen eye for smooth ladies (Billy Zane).

As Powell and his roving band of misfits fight their way through a German counterattack, Benitta and Saskia, members of the Dutch resistance (Lucy Gaskell and Coral Beed) have managed to pinpoint the location of the stolen loot, where it is about to be moved to Berlin  by the vile SS Major Kessler (Laurence Fox) and his troops. Risking their lives, they communicate this vital information to British Intelligence in a courageous attempt to liberate the occupied Netherlands. At the same time, renegade German forces race to get their hands on the loot as well. It’s a race against the clock, in the midst of a heated battle.

Cast
 Laurence Fox as SS Major Klaus Kessler, q ruthless Nazi tasked by the SS with safeguarding the loot.
 Louis Dempsey as Snyder
 Lucy Gaskell as Benitta, member of the Dutch resistance.
 Coral Beed as Saskia, member of the Dutch resistance.
 Andrew Howard as Captain Edward Banks
 Jack Dee as Warren
 Neil Newbon as Corporal Rhys Powell, An undercover SOE agent who has been tasked by British Intelligence as Matchbox's team lead.
 Nick Moran as Private Alan Ives, a smart mouthed petty thief and one of the few surviving members of Matchbox.
 Rafe Spall as Private David Wellings, A naïve medical orderly and one of the few surviving members of Matchbox.
 Tommy Flanagan as Private Dennis Baker, a drunken, somewhat psychotic bomb disposal expert and one of the few surviving members of Matchbox
 Sean Pertwee as Sergeant Bill McMillan, a battle hardened veteran and one of the few surviving members of Matchbox.
 Billy Zane as Lieutenant Robert Oates, a smooth talking RCAF pilot with a strong appetite for women, and one of the few surviving members of Matchbox
 Neil Jackson, Flight Lieutenant Simkins
 Steve Speirs as Gustav Hansfeldt
 Agathe De La Boulaye as Katrina
 David Ginola as Corporal Dieter Max
 Karel Roden as Sergeant Hans Beck, renegade German soldier bent on snatching the loot for himself.
 Alexander Skarsgård as Lieutenant Jergen Voller, renegade German soldier who has unfinished business to settle with Kessler, his brother.
 Michael Madsen as Lieutenant Colonel James T. Colt, a commander in the 101st Airborne Division.
 Todd Spangler as Lieutenant Jack Shannon
 Dave Evans as Private Meyer
 Justin Thompson as Steiner
 Gheorge Debre as Mayer
 Iaona Popescu-Galgotiu as Mayer's Wife
 Diarmid Scrimshaw as Museum Guide
 Aoife Madden as Janet

External links
 
 
 

2006 films
2006 independent films
2000s war films
British independent films
English-language Romanian films
Films shot in Romania
Films shot in Bucharest
Romanian independent films
War adventure films
Western Front of World War II films
British World War II films
Films set in the Netherlands
Films set in 1944
Films scored by David Julyan
Films about deserters
2000s English-language films
2000s British films